is a town located in Tochigi Prefecture, Japan. ,  the town had an estimated population of 15,824 in 6,028 households, and a population density of 82 persons per km². On October 4, 2013, a portion of the town was designated one of The Most Beautiful Villages in Japan.

Geography
Nakagawa is located in northeast Tochigi Prefecture.

Surrounding municipalities
Tochigi Prefecture
 Ōtawara
 Nasukarasuyama
 Sakura
Ibaraki Prefecture
 Hitachiōmiya
 Daigo

Climate
Nakagawa has a humid continental climate (Köppen Cfa) characterized by warm summers and cold winters with heavy snowfall.  The average annual temperature in Nakagawa is 12.8 °C. The average annual rainfall is 1418 mm with September as the wettest month. The temperatures are highest on average in August, at around 24.8 °C, and lowest in January, at around 1.6 °C.

Demographics
Per Japanese census data, the population of Nakagawa has declined over the past 60 years.

History
The town of Batō was created within Nasu District, Tochigi on May 29, 1891 with the establishment of the modern municipalities system. Nakagawa was created on October 1, 2005 from the merger of Batō with the neighboring town of Ogawa.

Government
Nakagawa has a mayor-council form of government with a directly elected mayor and a unicameral town council of 13 members. Nakagawa, together with the city of Nasukarasuyama collectively contributes one member to the Tochigi Prefectural Assembly. In terms of national politics, the town is part of Tochigi 3rd district of the lower house of the Diet of Japan.

Economy
The economy of Nakagawa is heavily dependent on agriculture.

Education
Nakagawa has three public  primary schools and public two middle schools operated by the town government. The town has one public high school operated by the Tochigi Prefectural Board of Education.

Transportation

Railway
Nakagawa does not have any passenger railway service.

Highway

Local attractions
Bato onsen
Nakagawa-machi Batō Hiroshige Museum of Art
Karanogosho Cave Tombs, National Historic Site
Nasu Kanga ruins, National Historic Site
Nasu Ogawa Kofun Cluster, National Historic Site
Nasu Kanda Castle ruins, National Historic Site

International relations
 - Horseheads, New York, USA from 1990.

References

External links

Official Website 

 
Towns in Tochigi Prefecture